Located in the south-eastern part of the city, Saga Higashi High School (佐賀県立佐賀東高等学校) is an Academic High School located in Saga City, Saga Prefecture, Japan.

History

Curriculum

Clubs 
Basketball Club
Badminton Club
Judo Club
Karate Club
Kendo Club
Table Tennis Club
Baseball Club
Softball Club
Volleyball Club
Brass Band Club
Tea Ceremony Club
Art Club
Photography Club
Computer Club
Drama Club
Calligraphy Club
Soccer Club
Flower Arranging Club
Baseball Club
Track and Field Club
Tennis Club
Naginata Club
Handball Club
Water Polo Club
Basketball Club

Alumni

See also
 List of high schools in Japan

External links
Saga Higashi High School Website - in Japanese

High schools in Japan
Schools in Saga Prefecture